Mariska Pokharel is a Nepalese film actress, model and artist. Her family gave her a Hebrew name 'Mariska' which means Mermaid or goddess of the sea. She made her acting debut in the movie Ke Ma Timro Hoina Ra (2016) directed by Akash Adhikari. Her second movie Chapali Height 2 was also released in the same year which was a 2016 Psychological Thriller Nepali movie directed by Dipendra K Khanal and produced by Arjun Kumar. It is sequel to the 2012 film Chapali Height.

Career 
Before appearing in Nepali movies, Pokharel was featured in an upcoming Hindi drama movie Yaara. The movie directed by Tigmanshu Dhulia is based in 'A Gang Story' by Oliver Marchal and features Vidyut Jammwal and Shruti Haasan  in leading roles. She made her acting debut in the movie Ke Ma Timro Hoina Ra (2016) alongside Aaryan Adhikari. She subsequently starred in Chapali Height 2 (2016), Lamphoo (2018), Pandit Bajeko Lauri (2018), Sali Kasko Bhenako (2018) and Mr. Virgin (2018). For her role as an escort in the movie Mr. Virgin (2018), Pokharel says she had to dive into research about the lifestyle and the daily schedule of ‘call girls’ in order to prepare to face the camera.

In 2015, Pokharel appeared in the music video for Swaroop Raj Acharya's Aaja Man Ma Timro. Since then she has worked on two dozen of Nepali music videos already by the mid of 2019. Her most viewed music videos on YouTube include Shirphool and Salko Paat. Bishnu Majhi's Salko Paat brought her fame and she gained notice by all age group of audiences.

Filmography

As Actress

As director 
Following are the music videos which are directed by her are as follows:

Music Video 
Pokharel has worked on nearly two dozen of music videos already by the mid 2019. Some of the music videos played by her are given below:

Philanthropy 

Beyond the silver screen, Pokharel is actively engaged in organizations working for children’s rights and keenly devotes time to her childhood fantasy of arts and paintings. She has been working as a coordinator for Human Life Protection Forum (non-profit organization) since early 2018. Pokharel is also involved with the service organization Rotary since 2017. Rotary International MHM is an American international service organization whose stated purpose is to bring together business and professional leaders in order to provide humanitarian service and to advance goodwill and peace around the world. She is an active member of Rotary Club of Baneshwor and is also the Director (Chair Public Relations) for 2019-20.

References 

Living people
People from Chitwan District
Year of birth missing (living people)
Nepalese film actresses
Actresses in Nepali cinema
Nepalese female models
Actresses in Hindi cinema
Nepalese expatriate actresses in India
21st-century Nepalese actresses